St Enoder was an electoral division of Cornwall in the United Kingdom which returned one member to sit on Cornwall Council between 2013 and 2021. It was abolished at the 2021 local elections, being succeeded by St Dennis and St Enoder.

Councillors

Extent
St Enoder represented the villages of Summercourt, Penhale, Fraddon, St Columb Road and Indian Queens, and the hamlets of Chapel Town, St Enoder, Trevarren and Toldish. The hamlet of Brighton was shared with the Ladock, St Clement and St Erme division, the village of Mitchell, Cornwall was shared with the Newlyn and Goonhavern division, and the hamlet of Black Cross was shared with the St Columb Major division. Although the division was nominally abolished at the 2013 election, the boundary changes had very little effect on the ward. Both before and after the boundary changes, the division covered 3567 hectares in total.

Election results

2017 election

2013 election

2009 election

References

Electoral divisions of Cornwall Council